Majid Assadi is an Iranian political prisoner in Gohardasht Prison, Iran. He has been arrested by Intelligence Ministry agents on February 18, 2017. On November 27, Branch 26 of the Tehran Revolutionary Court sentenced him to six years in prison and two years in exile in Borazjan, Bushehr Province for “propaganda against the state” and “assembly and collusion against national security.”

Arrest 
Assadi was previously sentenced to four years in prison in March 2010 for “assembly and collusion against national security” by Branch 15 of the Revolutionary Court. He completed the sentence on June 8, 2015.

Denied treatment 
Assadi suffers from severe diseases such as gastrointestinal diseases, including gastric ulcer and duodenal ulcer, as well as liver cysts, lumbar discs and spinal rheumatism. Despite his medical needs, prison authorities have denied hospital treatment.

See also

Human rights in the Islamic Republic of Iran
Evin Prison
 Gohardasht Prison

References 

Year of birth missing (living people)
Prisoners and detainees of Iran
Iranian prisoners and detainees
Iranian human rights activists
Hunger strikers
Living people